Speckhard is a surname. Notable people with the surname include:

 Anne Speckhard,  American Adjunct Associate Professor of Psychiatry
 Daniel V. Speckhard (born 1959), American diplomat and nonprofit executive